The Tobacco and Alcohol Market Regulatory Authority (TAPDK) was a government organization in Turkey with responsibility for regulation of smoking in Turkey and enforcement of alcohol laws of Turkey.

TAPDK was dissolved on 24 December 2017 and its authority transferred to the Ministry of Agriculture and Forestry of Turkey.

References

Government agencies established in 2002
Organizations based in Ankara
2002 establishments in Turkey
Government agencies disestablished in 2017
Regulatory and supervisory agencies of Turkey